The Norwood Ridge is a  rectangular upland which occupies the geographical centre of south London, centred  south of London Bridge. Beneath its topsoil it is a ridge of London Clay that is capped on all sides (including as isolated knolls in the north) with remaining natural gravel deposits mixed with some sandy soil, which in the South Thames basin is a material known as the Claygate Beds.

Extent and components

The area is rectangular, measuring  broad.  Its longest side is  if measured from central Brockley around which are three related knolls including Rye Hill, Nunhead or  less if the start-point of the ridge is taken as One Tree Hill, Honor Oak.  The upland is visible on terrain maps as three main parts of different elevation.

The high, eastern ridge (Sydenham Hill Ridge) runs from One Tree Hill SSE forming: the high western halves of Honor Oak and Forest Hill, then Upper Sydenham, the east of Gipsy Hill and Crystal Palace (which has, since the station of that name was built, among many residents replaced the Sydenham Hill and Anerley Hill names, except chiefly for the road Sydenham Hill which sits on the ridge), then Upper Norwood, then South Norwood Hill then the north-east of Thornton Heath and far north of Selhurst, in particular Grangewood Park. Upon the ridge is the Crystal Palace transmitting station, founded in 1933, the main television transmitter for the London area, and also the Croydon transmitting station.

The ridge is above  and from a few raised west-facing places the western ridge can be seen, beyond which is similar height Wimbledon Common.  The north has very narrow peaks which allow views of the tall buildings of Central London, but the ridge's eastern slope widely commands unobstructed views over Bromley and Addiscombe to the rises of Chislehurst as well as higher Kent parts of the North Downs. 
Nineteen of its access or approaching roads could be mistaken as forming separate structures, the greatest of which is the broad south slope leading west, Beulah Hill:-
Beulah Hill and Upper Beulah Hill, off of which are the following approaches:
Spa Hill
Biggin Hill (not to be confused with Biggin Hill further south at the edge of Greater London.
Norbury Hill 
Convent Hill
Gibson's Hill
Grange Hill
Sylvan Hill and Beaulieu Heights
Highfield Hill
Fox Hill
Westow Hill
Anerley Hill
Central Hill
Salters Hill
Westwood Hill
Round Hill
Derby Hill
Manor Mount
Cleve Hill
Honor Oak Rise

The slightly lower central near-plateau is listed from the north: East Dulwich; Dulwich; Kingswood Estate with West Dulwich and West Norwood with Gipsy Hill.  Two rises within this zone are Dawson's Rise and Knight's Hill.

The second or western ridge is narrower and fractionally lower. It begins very broad and gradually in the south around Furzedown, Streatham then runs through central Streatham, Tulse Hill, Herne Hill, Denmark Hill/Champion Hill culminating at the crossroads of Dog Kennel Hill/Grove Hill/Champion Hill.  Fourteen of its access points can be said to give areas of this rise their own 'Hill' or 'Mount' names:-
Bedford Hill
Mount Ephraim Road and Lane
Streatham Hill
Brixton Hill
Upper Tulse Hill
Tulse Hill
Birkbeck Hill
Herne Hill
Red Post Hill
Denmark Hill
Champion Hill
Dog Kennel Hill
Grove Hill
Bushey Hill

Some of the above slopes are in the catchment of the Effra, which had widespread Victorian housing and commercial use so has been converted into parallel combined and surface water sewers which feed into the Crossness works and tributaries of the tidal Thames respectively.  In the east the south slopes feed the Pool.

To the south underlying layers of London Clay and Palaeocene between the ridge and the dip slope of the North Downs, where on the near side is the Graveney which feeds into the River Wandle.

Human geography

Political geography and landmark status
The ridge and the historic oak tree known as The Vicars Oak (at the crossroads of the A212 Church Road and A214 Westow Hill) were used to mark parish boundaries. This has led to in particular the Crystal Palace area straddling the boundaries of five London Boroughs; Bromley, Croydon, Lambeth, Southwark and Lewisham. The ancient boundary between Surrey and Kent passes through the area and from 1889 to 1965 the area lay on the south eastern boundary of the County of London. It included parts of Kent and Surrey until 1889 and then parts of Kent, London and Surrey between 1889 and 1965.

For centuries the area was occupied by the Great North Wood, an extensive area of natural oak forest that formed a wilderness close to the southern edge of the then expanding city of London.  The forest was a popular area for Londoners' recreation right up to the 19th century, when it began to be built over. Some of the area was a home of Gypsies, with some street names and pubs recording the link.

Industry and conservation
Beds of clay and brickearth around the ridge hosted until the 20th century some of London's brickfields. Many railway tunnels cut through the ridge. The ridge still retains many vestiges of woodland.

See also
Great North Wood of which the Norwood Ridge formed a large minority.

References

Hills of London
Ridges of England